Gary Muhrcke (born c. 1940) is an American runner and former New York City fireman who won the first New York City Marathon in 1970. He also won the first Empire State Building Run-Up in 1978, and was a two-time winner of the Yonkers Marathon.

References

1940s births
American male marathon runners
New York City firefighters
New York City Marathon male winners
Track and field athletes from New York City
American male long-distance runners
Living people
20th-century American people